FC Barcelona had one of its most successful seasons in the club's history, retaining the domestic league supremacy and reaching the final of the UEFA Champions League; however they collapsed 0–4 against A.C. Milan (goals from Daniele Massaro, Dejan Savićević and Marcel Desailly). Their progress to the final in Athens had been virtually flawless. Indeed, on their way the Catalans had won four group games and drawn two to reach the semifinals, where they defeated FC Porto in a single-game tie at Camp Nou.

Romário and Hristo Stoichkov and Ronald Koeman were the main reasons for Barcelona' success. Rather than relying on the tight defence of the previous season, Barcelona had four of the league's top scorers.

Squad
Correct as of 23 October 2009.

Transfers

Winter

Friendlies

Competitions

La Liga

League table

Results by round

Matches

Copa del Rey

Round of 16

Quarter-finals

Supercopa de España

European Cup

First round

Second round

UEFA Champions League

Group stage

Semi-final

Final

Chronology
 Thursday, July 1 — PSV Eindhoven accepts a 400 million transfer for Romário, mostly financed with Witschge's 360 million transfer to Girondins.

Statistics

Players statistics

See also
FC Barcelona
1993–94 La Liga
Copa del Rey
Spanish Super Cup

References

External links
  Official Site
 FCBarcelonaweb.co.uk English Speaking FC Barcelona Supporters
 ESPNsoccernet: Barcelona Team Page 
 FC Barcelona (Spain) profile
 uefa.com - UEFA Champions League
 Web Oficial de la Liga de Fútbol Profesional
 
 

FC Barcelona seasons
Barcelona
Spanish football championship-winning seasons